Hippodrome de Wallonie is a horse racing venue located in Mons, Wallonia, Belgium.

External links
(fr)http://www.hippodromedewallonie.be/ Hippodrome Wallonie | Mons

Horse racing venues in Belgium
Sports venues in Hainaut (province)
Sport in Mons